The 2018–19 Florida State Seminoles men's basketball team represented Florida State University during the 2018–19 NCAA Division I men's basketball season. The Seminoles were led by head coach Leonard Hamilton, in his 17th year, and played their home games at the Donald L. Tucker Center on the university's Tallahassee, Florida campus as members of the Atlantic Coast Conference.

The Seminoles finished the season with a school record twenty-nine wins as well as a school record thirteen ACC wins, finishing in fourth place. Florida State reached the finals of the ACC tournament, finishing as runner-up; they received an at-large bid to the NCAA tournament as a four seed, advancing to the Sweet Sixteen for the second consecutive year and the sixth time in program history. They ended up losing to Gonzaga. The senior class, including Terrance Mann, Christ Koumadje, P.J. Savoy, and Phil Cofer, also became the winningest class in school history.

Previous season
The Seminoles finished the 2017–18 season with a record of 23–12, 9–9 in ACC play, to finish in a tie for eighth place. The Seminoles lost in the second round of the ACC tournament to Louisville. They received an at-large bid to the NCAA tournament where they defeated Missouri, Xavier, and Gonzaga to advance to the Elite Eight for the first time since 1993, where they lost to Michigan.

Offseason

Departures

Incoming transfers

Under NCAA transfer rules, Osbourne will have to sit out for the 2018–19 season, and will have three years of remaining eligibility.

2018 recruiting class

Roster

Schedule

|-
!colspan=12 style=|Exhibition

|-
!colspan=12 style=|Non-conference regular season

|-
!colspan=12 style=|ACC regular season

|-
!colspan=12 style=| ACC Tournament

|-
!colspan=12 style=| NCAA tournament

Awards
ACC Sixth Man of the Year
Mfiondu Kabengele

All-ACC
Honorable Mention
Mfiondu Kabengele
Terrance Mann

Rankings

*AP does not release post-NCAA Tournament rankings^Coaches did not release a Week 2 poll.

References

External links
 Official Team Website

Florida State
Florida State Seminoles men's basketball seasons
Florida State Seminoles men's basketball
Florida State Seminoles men's basketball
Florida State